The 2008–09 A1 Grand Prix season was the fourth and final season of the A1 Grand Prix formula. 

Ferrari supplied the engines for all entrants and advised on aspects of the chassis, based on its championship-winning F2004.

A1 Team Ireland became the fourth A1GP champions, after a title battle which went down to the final round in Great Britain. Ireland won with 112 points, with team driver Adam Carroll taking five victories at Chengdu, Sepang, Taupo and the series finale at Brands Hatch during the shortened 14 race season. Three rounds were cancelled for various reasons. The following season was cancelled.

A1 Team Switzerland finished the season in second place with 95 points and four wins by its driver Neel Jani. Third by just three points was A1 Team Portugal, whose driver Filipe Albuquerque took one race win.

Dutch pairing Jeroen Bleekemolen and Robert Doornbos each took a win to take A1 Team Netherlands to fourth position in the team standings with Fairuz Fauzy and Loïc Duval taking the remaining wins for A1 Team Malaysia and A1 Team France respectively.

Teams 
During the 2007–08 Shanghai race weekend, it was announced at an official ceremony that Korea would be participating in the 2008–09 season. Jung-Yong Kim of Omnibus Investment is the seat holder, with Good EMG supporting the project. Carlin Motorsport ran the racing team.

On 29 August 2008, it was announced that A1 Team Monaco would competing in season four. The joint seat holders were Hubertus Bahlsen, and former F3 and GP2 driver Clivio Piccione, who took on the driving duties.

Two teams appeared in A1GP documentation throughout the season but did not race. Wade Cherwayko's A1 Team Canada appeared on paper but the team did not show for any races and Adam Khan tested the A1 Team Pakistan car on a number of occasions but did not travel to any races.

The 21 teams that started a race in the 2008–09 championship were:

New "Powered by Ferrari" car

On 11 October 2007, A1GP and Ferrari announced a six-year collaboration on the new generation of A1GP cars. The new "Powered by Ferrari" car is a modification of the Formula One Ferrari F2004 chassis with a V8 Ferrari engine producing 600 bhp. The car was officially revealed in Southern England, and driven for the first time by John Watson in an inaugural event in May 2008. Michelin supplied the tyres for the new car.

The car was developed and tested over more than 5600 kilometres at Mugello Circuit, Fiorano Circuit, Autodromo Enzo e Dino Ferrari, Circuito Guadix, Silverstone Circuit, Donington Park, Circuit Paul Ricard and Circuit de Nevers Magny-Cours. Andrea Bertolini was the main test driver, but testing was carried out by Marc Gené, Patrick Friesacher, Jonny Kane and Danny Watts during the sessions at Silverstone Circuit.

Off-season tests and car presentations 
On 2–3 August 2008, the first press and public presentation of the A1GP Powered by Ferrari car was held on the TT Circuit Assen with former A1 Team Netherlands driver, Renger van der Zande. Two weeks after, the car was presented in Rotterdam during the Bavaria City Racing Festival. The A1 Team Netherlands car was driven by Carlo van Dam.

Pre-season tests of the new 'powered by Ferrari' car took place on consecutive weekends in September at Donington Park, Mugello and Snetterton.

Rule changes 

A number of rules were changed for the 2008–09 season.
The four qualifying sessions were reduced in length from fifteen minutes to ten minutes each.
Teams may now utilise a "joker" qualifying lap (from Malaysia onwards). In one of the four qualifying sessions the team may elect to utilise their joker – for the flying lap in that session, the driver is granted the availability of the PowerBoost button for the entire lap.
The Sprint Race has been increased from 19 minutes plus one lap, to 24 minutes plus one lap, as well as a mandatory pit-stop being added between laps four and eight, brought into effect starting in Malaysia.
The Sprint Race now only scores the top eight positions: 10, 8, 6, 5, 4, 3, 2, 1.
Only the best 8 race weekends will count towards the championship. Both the Sprint and Feature race points from one event will be dropped by teams that race all 9 events. This is to ensure that teams that will miss Zandvoort due to the lack of cars, will still have a fair chance at the title.

An update to the sporting regulations means that technical details of the fastest lap in any session (practice or qualifying) will be made available to all teams after the session ends. This is to allow slower or weaker teams to learn how they can improve their own lap times, making the "field spread" that much smaller.

Several detailed changes to the Friday "rookie sessions" were released on 1 September 2008:
The age limit for rookie drivers (driver had to be younger than 25), has been abolished.
Drivers who have competed in Formula One, GP2, the IndyCar Series, Formula Nippon, or the former Champ Car World Series cannot participate in the rookie session.
Total track time is increased from 50 minutes to an hour.
The gap between the two half sessions is increased from 10 to 20 minutes.

Season calendar 

The season started at the Circuit Park Zandvoort, Netherlands on 5 October 2008.

Further timetable details were announced on 9 June 2008.

On 21 August 2008, the Italy race at Mugello was moved back following a delay in the build schedule of the new chassis, and Zandvoort was named as the first race of the season. A replacement date was not announced.

Further timetable changes were announced on 26 August 2008. The Chinese round was confirmed to be held at Chengdu Goldenport Circuit, and swapped places in the calendar with the Indonesian round at Jakarta. Subsequent to that, the Indonesian race was moved back further, to 8 February due to track construction.

On 9 September 2008, Brands Hatch was confirmed as hosting the race in Great Britain at the end of the season. It was also announced that as a replacement date for the Mugello race could not be found, the race was removed from the season's schedule.

According to a revised international FIA calendar issued on 19 December, the A1GP season finale is to be held at Interlagos on the weekend of 15–17 May 2009.

Round 5 at Lippo Village, Indonesia was cancelled on 16 January due to the circuit missing a construction deadline, mainly caused by a heavy rain season. The Mexican round was also moved back by one week, so as to avoid clashing with a Radiohead music concert, which was to take place in the baseball stadium inside the circuit at the original date.

On 17 February 2009 the A1GP Gauteng official preview reported that the Mexico City round was no longer to take place on the weekend of 20–22 March and a replacement date was being sought. eTicket.com.mx advertised the event as it should take place on the weekend of 22–24 May, and was confirmed on 31 March 2009, subject to the FIA-stipulated changes to the Peraltada corner.

On 5 March the proposed Interlagos race was removed from the circuit's official calendar, presumably signalling an end to A1GP's plans to run a race meeting there.

On 29 April 2009 it was confirmed that the Mexican round was cancelled due to an outbreak of swine flu.

Standings

References

External links
A1GP official web-site

 
A1GP
A1GP
A1 Grand Prix
A1 Grand Prix